Phil or Philip Wilson may refer to:

Music
 Phil Wilson (trombonist) (born 1937), American jazz trombonist and educator
 Phillip Wilson (1941–1992), American jazz drummer
 Phil Wilson (singer), with The June Brides

Politics
 Philip Whitwell Wilson (1875–1956), British Liberal politician and journalist
 Phil Wilson (British politician) (born 1959), British Labour MP for Sedgefield
 Phill Wilson (born 1956), AIDS activist

Sports
 Phil Wilson (footballer, born 1960), English footballer
 Phil Wilson (footballer, born 1972), English footballer
 Phil Wilson (curler) (born 1965), Scottish curler
 Phil Wilson (hurler) (born 1939), Irish sportsman
 Phillip Wilson (rower) (born 1996), New Zealand Olympic rower

Other
 Philip Wilson (bishop) (1950–2021), Catholic archbishop of the Archdiocese of Adelaide, Australia
 Philip D. Wilson Jr. (1920–2016), orthopedic surgeon
 Philip Morrell Wilson (1937–2003), conman and swindler
 Phil Wilson, character in In the Flesh (TV series)
 Philip Wilson Jr., Realtor in Carmel-by-the-Sea, California